Peroxiredoxin-1 is a protein that in humans is encoded by the PRDX1 gene.

Function 

This gene encodes a member of the peroxiredoxin family of antioxidant enzymes, which reduce hydrogen peroxide and alkyl hydroperoxides. The encoded protein may play an antioxidant protective role in cells, and may contribute to the antiviral activity of CD8(+) T-cells. This protein may have a proliferative effect and play a role in cancer development or progression. Three transcript variants encoding the same protein have been identified for this gene.

Interactions 

Peroxiredoxin 1 has been shown to interact with PRDX4. A chemoproteomic approach has revealed that peroxiredoxin 1 is the main target of theonellasterone.

Clinical significance 

As enzymes that combat oxidative stress, peroxiredoxins play an important role in health and disease. Peroxiredoxin 1 and peroxiredoxin 2 have been shown to be released by some cells when stimulated by LPS or TNF-alpha. The released peroxiredoxin can then act to produce inflammatory cytokines. The levels of peroxiredoxin 1 are elevated in pancreatic cancer and it can potentially act as a marker for the diagnosis and prognosis of this disease. In some types of cancer, peroxiredoxin 1 has been determined to act as a tumor suppressor and other studies show that peroxiredoxin 1 is overexpressed in certain human cancers. A recent study has found that peroxiredoxin 1 may play a role in tumorigenesis by regulating the mTOR/p70S6K pathway in esophageal squamous cell carcinoma. The expression patterns of peroxiredoxin 1 along with peroxiredoxin 4 are involved in human lung cancer malignancy. It has also been shown that peroxiredoxin 1 may be an important player in the pathogenesis of acute respiratory distress syndrome because of its role in promoting inflammation.

References

Further reading

External links